Paul Morwood (born 2 March 1959) is a former Australian rules footballer in the Victorian Football League.

South Melbourne/Sydney
He started his career with South Melbourne (like his younger brothers Tony Morwood and Shane Morwood).

St Kilda
He crossed to St Kilda, debuting in the same match as fellow former Swan Silvio Foschini who had been granted a court ruling in a restraint of trade against South Melbourne. Peter Kiel made way for Morwood. Tony Lockett also made his debut in the same match.

Morwood also won the Saints' best and fairest in 1985.

Later career
After three years with St. Kilda, he moved back to the Swans in 1986 (now based in Sydney) for one year before finishing his career at Collingwood in 1987. He decided to retire at the end of that season due to his outside business interest, which was running a hotel.

External links
 Goals kicked by the Morwoods af AFL.com.au
 Morwood's debut for St Kilda
 
 

Trevor Barker Award winners
St Kilda Football Club players
Collingwood Football Club players
Sydney Swans players
Australian rules footballers from Victoria (Australia)
Living people
1959 births